Reasons may also refer to:

 Reasons (argument), considerations which count in favor of an argument's conclusion or a belief
 Reasons (Angelit album), 2003
 Reasons, a 1996 film starring LisaRaye McCoy
 "Reasons" (Earth, Wind & Fire song), 1975
 "Reasons" (John Farnham song), 1986
 "Reasons", a 1994 song by Built to Spill from There's Nothing Wrong with Love
 "Reasons", a 1984 song by Chris Rea from Wired to the Moon
 "Reasons", a 2004 song by Kotipelto from Coldness 
 "Reasons", a 2009 song by New Found Glory from Not Without a Fight
 "Reasons", a 1973 song by Roger Daltrey from Daltrey
 "Reasons", a 2020 song by San Cisco from Flaws
 "Reasons", a 2005 song by UB40 from Who You Fighting For?

See also 
 Reason (disambiguation)